The Credo is a composition for choir and orchestra set to the text of the Nicene Creed by the Scottish composer James MacMillan.  It was first performed August 7, 2012 at The Proms in Royal Albert Hall, London, by the BBC Philharmonic, the Manchester Chamber Choir, the Northern Sinfonia Chorus, and the Rushley Singers under the conductor Juanjo Mena.

Composition
The Credo has a duration of roughly 20 minutes and is composed in three movements:
Pater
Filius
Spiritus Sanctus

Instrumentation
The work is scored for an SATB choir and orchestra comprising two flutes, oboe, cor anglais, two clarinets, two bassoons (2nd doubling contrabassoon), two horns, two trumpets, timpani, and strings.

Reception
Reviewing the world premiere, George Hall of The Guardian praised the Credo, writing:
Conversely, Ivan Hewett of The Daily Telegraph criticized MacMillan's mix of traditional and contemporary tonalities, remarking, "Sometimes this worked well, as in the Crucifixus section, where two high violas entwined beautifully round the voices. But at length the sheer profusion of styles became bewildering. We heard Messiaen-like bird twitterings, folk-like decorative swirls. There were minatory brass outcries when the text spoke of judgment, and certain phrases were shouted three times."  He continued, "This was presumably a Trinitarian reference, but in musical terms it just felt hectoring. As often happens in MacMillan's religious music, the green shoots of musical invention were crushed by the heavy-handed symbolism.

See also
List of compositions by James MacMillan
Credo (Vivaldi)

References

Compositions by James MacMillan
2011 compositions
Compositions for symphony orchestra
Choral compositions
Music commissioned by the BBC